The Church of St. Peter and St. Paul, often referred to as Coleshill Parish Church, is the parish church of Coleshill, Warwickshire, England. The church is a Grade I listed building.

History
The oldest part of the church dates back to the 14th century, but most of the rest of the church was built in the 15th century. There is a clue to a church before this with the Norman font in the church. There is evidence of a priest here as far back as 1086. Norman foundations were found here during excavations but it is not known when the first church was built at this site.  Due to the wooded area that used to surround Coleshill, it is thought that before the current church began construction there must have been a church made from timber, almost certainly on the site of the current church. 

The spire was rebuilt in the 15th century. During extensive renovations of the church in the 1860s, including replastering of most of the building and replacing the roof with tiles, the spire was rebuilt again.

In 1961 many buildings up and down the country were listed. The church was included in this and on 8 September 1961 the Church of St. Peter and St. Paul gained the Grade I Listed status, the highest level possible.

References

Church of England church buildings in Warwickshire
Grade I listed churches in Warwickshire
Coleshill, Warwickshire